Nathalie Armbruster (born 2 January 2006) is a German nordic combined skier.

Nordic combined results

World Championships
All results are sourced from the International Ski Federation (FIS).

World Championships
 2 medals – (2 silver)

World Cup

Season standings

References

External links

2006 births
Living people
German female Nordic combined skiers
21st-century German women
FIS Nordic World Ski Championships medalists in Nordic combined